Aşağı Göynük (also, Aşağı Köynük, Ashaga-Geynyuk, Ashagy Gëynyuk, and Novo Gyuinuk) is a village and municipality in the Shaki Rayon of Azerbaijan.  It has a population of 2,599.

References 

Populated places in Shaki District